Cold Aston (also known as Aston Blank) is a village and civil parish in Gloucestershire, England, approximately  to the east of Gloucester. It lies in the Cotswolds, an Area of Outstanding Natural Beauty. In the 2011 census, the population was 255.

History

Toponymy
The village was recorded as Eastunæ between 716–43. It was listed in the Domesday Book of 1086 as Estone, the name coming from the Old English ēast + tūn meaning "eastern farmstead or estate". By the mid 13th century, the village was known as Cold Aston. It was occasionally called Great Aston, to distinguish it from the nearby hamlet of Little Aston. From the 16th century, the name Aston Blank took hold, the suffix "Blank" possibly deriving from the Old French word blanc, meaning "white" or "bare". In 1972, the parish officially became known as Cold Aston again. Some think that the name "cold" is derived from the Saxon word which refers to a former settlement – in this case, probably referring to a disused Roman camp or rest place for use when travelling the Fosse Way. It is fairly certain, contrary to common modern thinking, that the word "Cold" has no link to a meteorological reference.

Governance
Cold Aston is part of the Bourton-on-the-Water ward of the district of Cotswold, represented by Councillors Sheila Jeffery and Len Wilkins, and by Charles Alfred Richard Gillams, all members of the Conservative Party. Cold Aston is part of the constituency of Cotswold, represented at parliament by Conservative MP Geoffrey Clifton-Brown. It was part of the South West England constituency of the European Parliament prior to Britain leaving the European Union in January 2020.

Geography
Cold Aston is in the county of Gloucestershire and lies within the Cotswolds, a range of hills designated an Area of Outstanding Natural Beauty. Nearby villages include Turkdean, Notgrove, Clapton, Naunton and Lower Slaughter. The ancient parish of Cold Ashton contained  and was roughly square in shape, in 1987 the parish was enlarged.

Landmarks

The Church of St Andrew is the Church of England parish church. It is a largely Norman building, though its walls incorporate Saxon stonework and the original church on this site may have been built in around AD 904. A leading modern authority refers approvingly to the "very good" west tower of three stages and other Perpendicular elements of the church, commenting, "All is evidently the work of the best Cotswold masons, and is the fifteenth-century aggrandizement of a Norman church". Much of the present church was restored in 1875.

The village pub, The Plough, is a 17th-century Grade II listed building. It is the only pub between the three villages of Cold Aston, Turkdean and Notgrove in May 2013 re-opened after an extensive refurbishment. It now also offers accommodation. The pub's landlord claims that it is residence to a ghost named Old Harry.

Education
The village has one primary school, Cold Aston Church of England Primary School, a voluntary controlled school for children from the age of 4–11. In 2019, the school had 87 pupils.

References

External links

 Official village site
 

Villages in Gloucestershire
Cotswold District